McVey was an unincorporated community in Raleigh County, West Virginia, United States.

References

Ghost towns in West Virginia
History of West Virginia
Geography of Raleigh County, West Virginia